Nipon Pensuvapap (born 7 March 1941) is a Thai sprinter. He competed in the men's 4 × 400 metres relay at the 1964 Summer Olympics.

References

1941 births
Living people
Athletes (track and field) at the 1964 Summer Olympics
Nipon Pensuvapap
Nipon Pensuvapap
Nipon Pensuvapap
Place of birth missing (living people)
Nipon Pensuvapap